Kristoffer Martin Roach Dangculos (born November 20, 1994) is a Filipino actor. His career started when he joined the talent TV show Little Big Superstar where he was eliminated on the second week. He appeared in a couple of TV shows in ABS-CBN such as Prinsesa ng Banyera, Kung Fu Kids, Ligaw na Bulaklak and Pare Koy where he was known as Kristofer Dangculos.

In 2010, Martin moved to GMA 7 drama shows such as Endless Love, Tween Hearts, Munting Heredera, Pahiram ng Sandali, Kakambal ni Eliana and Kahit Nasaan Ka Man. He also appeared regularly on the Sunday variety show Sunday All Stars.

Career
Martin started his career on television when he joined a search for young singers. He also appeared as a TV guest in multiple ABS-CBN programs such as Boy & Kris, ASAP '08 and Wowowee. He has made several mall shows around Metro Manila and provinces when he joined Little Big Superstar together with his co-stars in Kung Fu Kids.

Kristofer on ABS-CBN (2007–2009)
In ABS-CBN, KrisM's screen name is Kristofer Dangculos. KrisM's career started when he joined Little Big Superstar, a search reality-variety show for kids with good singing ability. He became one of the ten finalist but he was eliminated in the second week of the finals. He appeared in Prinsesa ng Banyera, a noon-time drama after Wowowee. He played the role of the young Eric Fragante, who became TJ Trinidad when the character grew up. He was paired with Jane Oineza, also his co-star in Kung Fu Kids, who played the role of the young Maningning Burgos (who later became Kristine Hermosa).

KrisM became famous because of Kung Fu Kids, his first fantaserye drama series in ABS-CBN. In the said series, he plays the role of Benjamin "Benjo" Reyes, a bully always involved in rumbles, also known as Kid Bully.  In Ligaw na Bulaklak, he played the role of Chuckie, the foster son of Mrs. Reyes (Arlene Muhlach) and the brother of Ian (Ron Morales).  In Parekoy that was aired on January 5, 2009, Kristofer played as Ringgo.

Kristofer on GMA Network (2010–present)
After playing young Johnny (played by Dingdong Dantes) in the remake of the 2000 South Korean drama series, Endless Love, Kristofer became a GMA Artist Center talent with the screen name, Kristoffer Martin.  In Endless Love, he was paired with Kathryn Bernardo.  Martin entered GMA Network with his former Kung Fu Kids co-star Joshua Dionisio. Kristofer signed an exclusive three-year contract until 2013. He appeared in the teen-oriented show Tween Hearts and  Munting Heredera where he was paired with Joyce Ching.

In the mid-2012, he was included as cast member of drama series on GMA Network entitled Luna Blanca and played the role of Joaquin "Aki" Alvarez.  In 2013, he starred in two television dramas. The first drama being Kakambal ni Eliana where he is paired with Kim Rodriguez for the first time. Before the year ended he was cast in the drama Kahit Nasaan Ka Man where he is paired with Julie Anne San Jose. In 2014, he starred in Paraiso Ko'y Ikaw where he is again paired with Kim Rodriguez

In 2015, KrisM appeared in one episode of Karelasyon  where he plays a mama's boy.  In 2016, KrisM was featured in the record album One Heart that was released by GMA Records.

Personal life
Martin is fond of mountain climbing and he climbs mountains together with other actors like Alden Richards, Rodjun Cruz, Kylie Padilla and Dianne Medina.

Martin previously dated Joyce Ching from 2011 to 2013, that made them dubbed as "ex-goals" due to them pairing up before in several GMA shows.

In April 2021, Martin revealed that he began dating Actress and model, Liezel Lopez when asked about the rumored relationship with each other in The Boobay and Tekla Show to the public. They have broken up since.

Martin married his non-showbiz girlfriend, AC Banzon in Capas, Tarlac in February 2022. The two had dated for seven years before breaking up in December 2020, they reportedly reconciled in July 2021; the couple had a child named Pré.

Filmography

Variety and reality shows

Films

Discography

Awards and nominations

References

External links
 
 Kristofer Dangculos official

1994 births
Living people
People from Olongapo
Filipino male child actors
Filipino male television actors
21st-century Filipino male singers
Filipino male dancers
Participants in Philippine reality television series
Star Magic
ABS-CBN personalities
GMA Network personalities
GMA Music artists
Male actors from Zambales
Filipino Protestants
Ilocano people